Stree is a 1961 Indian fantasy film directed by and starring V. Shantaram, Sandhya. It is based on the play Abhijnanashakuntalam by Kalidasa. The film was selected as the Indian entry for the Best Foreign Language Film at the 34th Academy Awards, but was not accepted as a nominee. The film has music by C. Ramchandra and lyrics by Bharat Vyas. Lata Mangeshkar, Asha Bhosle, Mahendra Kapoor, Manna Dey lent their voices. "Aaj Madhuvatas Dole Madhurima Se Pran Bhar Lo" sung by Lata Mangeshkar and Mahendra Kapoor was popular song of the era.

Cast
 V. Shantaram
 Sandhya
 Rajshree
 Master Bhagwan
 Vandana
 Keshavrao Date
 Padma Chavan

See also
 List of submissions to the 34th Academy Awards for Best Foreign Language Film
 List of Indian submissions for the Academy Award for Best Foreign Language Film

References

External links
 

1961 films
1960s fantasy films
1960s Hindi-language films
Indian fantasy films
Films directed by V. Shantaram
Films based on the Mahabharata
Films based on works by Kalidasa
Works based on Shakuntala (play)